Blue Grotto may refer to:

Blue Grotto (Biševo), a cave on the Croatian island of Biševo
Blue Grotto (Capri), a cave on the Italian island of Capri
Blue Cave (Kastellorizo), a cave on the Greek Island of Megisti (Kastelorizo)
Blue Grotto (Malta), a cave in Malta
Blue Grotto, an area under the Manhattan end of the Brooklyn Bridge
Grotta Azzurra (restaurant) an eatery in New York City
Grotta dello Smeraldo, a cave at the Amalfi Coast in Italy

See also
 Blue Cave (disambiguation)